Badha is a village in the Gurgaon mandal of the Indian state of Haryana.

Nearby villages include Hayatpur, Kankrola, Naharpur Kasan, Wazirpur, Bhangrola and Dhorka.

References 

Villages in Gurgaon district